Evippomma is a genus of spiders in the family Lycosidae. It was first described in 1959 by Roewer. , it contains 6 species.

Species
Evippomma comprises the following species:
Evippomma albomarginatum Alderweireldt, 1992
Evippomma evippiforme (Caporiacco, 1935)
Evippomma evippinum (Simon, 1897)
Evippomma plumipes (Lessert, 1936)
Evippomma simoni Alderweireldt, 1992
Evippomma squamulatum (Simon, 1898)

References

Lycosidae
Araneomorphae genera
Spiders of Africa
Spiders of Asia
Taxa named by Carl Friedrich Roewer